Marroneto is a village in Tuscany, central Italy, administratively a frazione of the comune of Santa Fiora, province of Grosseto, in the area of Mount Amiata.

The village is named after the marroni (chestnuts).

Geography 
Marroneto is about 65 km from Grosseto and 1 km from Santa Fiora. The village is so close to Santa Fiora that it is considered a peripheral neighbourhood of the town. It is situated along the Provincial Road which links Santa Fiora to Bagnolo and Piancastagnaio.

Subdivisions 
Marroneto is composed by eight hamlets: Case Baciacchi, Case Bigi, Case Raspini, Case Tonini, Gretini, Mormoraio, Renaiolo – the oldest one – and Soana.

Traditions 
The village is known for its well-preserved primitive traditions: the most important one is that of Carnevale Morto (Dead Carnival), an old ritual where Quaresima metaphorically kills Carnevale.

Notes

Bibliography 
 
 

Frazioni of Santa Fiora